Martz Group is a bus company headquartered in Wilkes-Barre, Pennsylvania, operating intercity commuter buses, charter buses, and tours. The company operates Martz Trailways, which is a part of the Trailways Transportation System. Martz Trailways provides intercity commuter bus service from the Wyoming Valley cities of Wilkes-Barre and Scranton and the Pocono Mountains in Northeastern Pennsylvania to New York City and Philadelphia. The company runs buses connecting Northeastern Pennsylvania to the casinos in Atlantic City, New Jersey and Wind Creek Bethlehem. Martz Group operates the Gold Line commuter service and Gray Line sightseeing service in Washington, D.C. and the First Class Coach Company Trailways serving Tampa and St. Petersburg in Florida. Martz Bus also offers interstate and intrastate charter bus services.

The company was founded in 1908 by Frank Martz Sr. (1885–1936) as the White Transit Company, originally operating local buses in Luzerne County, Pennsylvania. The Frank Martz Coach Company was founded in 1922 to provide intercity bus service. Martz helped establish the Trailways Transportation System, which formed a national bus system through alliances between multiple carriers. Ownership of the company remains within the Martz family, with Scott Henry of the fourth generation serving as President of Martz Group.

Service
Martz Trailways operates intercity bus service connecting the Wyoming Valley cities of Wilkes-Barre and Scranton and the Pocono Mountains in Northeastern Pennsylvania to the Northeast Megalopolis cities of New York City and Philadelphia along with casino runs to Atlantic City, New Jersey and Wind Creek Bethlehem.

Commuter bus service is provided by Martz Trailways from Wilkes-Barre, Scranton, and the Pocono Mountains to various points in New York City, with frequent service on weekdays and less frequent service on weekends. In the Wyoming Valley, the commuter buses to New York City serve Wilkes-Barre, the Wyoming Valley Mall, and Scranton. Places in the Pocono Mountains served by Martz Trailways's commuter buses to New York City include Blakeslee, Tobyhanna, Mt. Pocono, Effort, Brodheadsville, Snydersville, Marshalls Creek, Tannersville, Stroudsburg, and Delaware Water Gap. Some runs to New York City serve Panther Valley, New Jersey. Most buses operating to New York City terminate at the Port Authority Bus Terminal in Midtown Manhattan, with some runs providing service to Madison Avenue in Midtown Manhattan and Wall Street in Lower Manhattan. Martz Trailways also operates bus service connecting the Port Authority Bus Terminal in New York City to indoor water parks in the Pocono Mountains including Great Wolf Lodge, Kalahari Resort, and Aquatopia. Martz Trailways runs commuter buses connecting Wilkes-Barre and Scranton, providing daily service between the two cities. Commuter buses operated by Martz Trailways provide daily service from Scranton, Wilkes-Barre, White Haven, Allentown, and Quakertown to Philadelphia. In Philadelphia, the buses serve 30th Street Station and the Philadelphia Greyhound Terminal. Martz Trailways's intercity commuter bus service offers one-way and round-trip fares along with commuter fares for frequent commuters.

Martz Trailways operates bus service from Wilkes-Barre, Scranton, and the Pocono Mountains to the Atlantic City casinos and Wind Creek Bethlehem. The buses to Atlantic City provide daily service from Wilkes-Barre, the Wyoming Valley Mall, and Scranton. In Atlantic City, the buses stop at Tropicana Casino & Resort Atlantic City, Resorts Casino Hotel, and Caesars Atlantic City. Trips to Atlantic City can be bought as a day trip or an overnight trips; patrons are responsible for accommodations for overnight trips. The buses to Wind Creek Bethlehem provide service on Thursdays and the last Sunday of the month from Wilkes-Barre, the Wyoming Valley Mall, Scranton, and Mt. Pocono.

Martz Curbside Express provides service from colleges in Wilkes-Barre and Scranton to New York City. The Wilkes-Barre Curbside service runs on Wednesdays and Saturdays from Misericordia University in Dallas, and Wilkes University, King's College, and the Wyoming Valley Mall in Wilkes-Barre to the Port Authority Bus Terminal and Madison Avenue in Midtown Manhattan. The Scranton Curbside service runs on Wednesdays and Saturdays from Greenrige Plaza, Marywood University, and the University of Scranton in Scranton to the Port Authority Bus Terminal and Madison Avenue in Midtown Manhattan.

Martz Trailways provides charter bus service for groups such as schools, colleges and universities, senior groups, religious groups, camps, sports teams, weddings and tour operators. The company offers charter services, excursions, retail packages, custom packages, and Broadway ticket sales. Martz Tours offers entertainment tours in Scranton, Wilkes-Barre, and the Pocono Mountains, with single-day and multi-day trips to places across the United States. Martz Luxury Service offers luxury van transportation for up to six people for occasions such as golf outings or airport service.

In addition to the Martz Trailways service in Northeastern Pennsylvania, Martz Group has operations in Washington, D.C., Virginia, and Florida. In Washington, D.C., Martz Group operates Gold Line commuter service connecting to suburban areas in Maryland and Gray Line sightseeing service. The Gold Line commuter service operates five routes under contract with the Maryland Transit Administration. Route 202 provides service from Gaithersburg to Fort Meade, Route 610 connects Waldorf to Washington, D.C., Route 620 connects Waldorf and St. Charles Towne Center to Washington, D.C., Route 650 connects La Plata, Waldorf, and Accokeek to Washington, D.C., and Route 810 connects Anne Arundel County to Washington, D.C.

In Virginia, Martz Group operates the National Coach Works serving Fredericksburg. Up until April 2021, National Coach Works provided commuter bus service from the Fredericksburg area to Washington, D.C. The National Coach Works also operates two commuter routes under contract with the Maryland Transit Administration that connect Southern Maryland with Washington, D.C. Route 705 connects the Charlotte Hall Shopping Center in Charlotte Hall and the Mattawoman-Beantown park and ride in Waldorf with Washington, D.C. and the Route 715 connects the Golden Beach park and ride in Charlotte Hall and the Mattawoman-Beantown park and ride in Waldorf with Washington, D.C. There is also charter bus service offered by the National Coach Works, serving Fredericksburg, Richmond, and Washington, D.C. 

In Florida, Martz Group operates the First Class Coach Company Trailways serving Tampa and St. Petersburg. First Class Coach Company Trailways offers charter bus service.

Martz also operates services for OurBus.  it operates Amtrak Thruway routes to 30th Street Station in Philadelphia via Allentown.

History
The origins of the company date back to 1908, when Frank Martz Sr. founded the White Transit Company in Plymouth, Pennsylvania, operating between mining towns in the Coal Region. In 1912, Martz Sr. started local routes in the Luzerne County area, which were sold to the Luzerne County Transportation Authority in 1974. Martz Sr. founded the Frank Martz Coach Company in 1922 to offer intercity bus service. By 1927, the Frank Martz Coach Company had routes operating from Wilkes-Barre to New York City, Philadelphia, Albany, New York, Syracuse, New York, Buffalo, New York, Cleveland, Detroit, and Chicago. In 1926, Martz Sr. began airline service between New York City, Elmira, New York, and Buffalo. The airline service was discontinued in 1933 due to the Great Depression. Martz Sr. was one of the founders of the National Trailways Bus System, which formed a national bus system through alliances between multiple carriers, competing with Greyhound Lines for national bus service. 

Martz Sr. died in 1936 and his son Frank Martz Jr. took over the company. The company continued to grow in the following years. Martz Jr. was killed in a helicopter accident in 1964, and ownership of the company passed to Frank M. Henry, the grandson of company founder Martz Sr. Ownership of the company remains within the family, with Scott Henry of the fourth generation currently President of Martz Group. In 2016, Martz Group went through a rebranding, in which they added 116 coaches, new operations in Washington, D.C., Virginia, and Florida, and the introduction of Martz Luxury Service. The company also upgraded buses.

References

External links

Martz Trailways
Gold Line
National Coach Works
First Class Coach Company Trailways

Intercity bus companies of the United States
Bus transportation in Florida
Bus transportation in Maryland
Bus transportation in New Jersey
Bus transportation in New York (state)
Bus transportation in Pennsylvania
Bus transportation in Virginia
Bus transportation in Washington, D.C.
Transport companies established in 1908
Companies based in Luzerne County, Pennsylvania
Transportation companies based in Pennsylvania
Trailways Transportation System